Novickis is a surname which is a rendering of the Slavic surname Nowicki/Novitsky/Navitski. In Latvian and Lithuanian, which require the suffix "-s"/"-is"/"-as" for nouns of masculine gender.

In Lithuanian it may be also rendered as Navickis and Navickas.

Feminine forms: 
Novicka in Latvian
Navickienė/Novickienė (married woman) Navickaitė/Novickaitė/Navickytė/Novickytė (unmarried woman) in Lithuanian

The surname may refer to:

Alfons Novickis (1906–1931), Latvian footballer
Voldemaras Novickis (1956–2022), Soviet/Lithuanian handball player

See also

Lithuanian-language surnames
Latvian-language masculine surnames